Manaivi Oru Manickam is a 1990 Indian Tamil-language supernatural thriller film, directed by Chozharaajan and produced by N. Ramasamy. The film stars Arjun, Mukesh (in his Tamil debut), Radha, Sadhana and S. S. Chandran. The film was released on 17 March 1990, and ran 100 days.

Plot

Cast 

Arjun as Vijay
Mukesh as Ravi
Radha as Gayathri
Sadhana as Female Serpent
Radha Ravi in a Guest Appearance
S. S. Chandran
Babloo
Dubbing Janaki as Meenakshi
Charle
Idichapuli Selvaraj
Kullamani
Y. Vijaya
Kovai Sarala
Disco Shanthi

Soundtrack 
The soundtrack consist of five songs composed by Shankar–Ganesh. Lyrics are by Vaali.

References

External links 
 

1990 films
1990s supernatural thriller films
1990s Tamil-language films
Films about snakes
Films directed by Rama Narayanan
Films scored by Shankar–Ganesh
Indian supernatural thriller films